Fixate is an EP by Numb, released in 1993 by KK Records. The EP contains a different version of "Ratblast" performed at double tempo, which normally how the band performed the song live. "Headcrash (Skullcrusher)" is Don Gordon's personal favorite track on the release.

Track listing

Personnel
Adapted from the Fixate liner notes.

Numb
 Don Gordon – instruments, production and editing (1-3, 7, 8), illustrations
 Conan Hunter – lead vocals, instruments, production and editing (1-3, 7, 8), illustrations

Additional musicians
 Richard Hanley – additional percussion

Production and design
 Fitz – photography
 Ken Marshall – production (1, 2, 7, 8), recording and mixing (4-6)
 Steakface – cover art, design
 Anthony Valcic – editing (7, 8)
 Craig Waddell – editing (4-6)

Release history

References

External links 
 Fixate at Discogs (list of releases)

1993 EPs
Numb (band) albums